Linguistic insecurity comprises feelings of anxiety, self-consciousness, or lack of confidence in the mind of a speaker surrounding their use of language. Often, this anxiety comes from speakers' belief that their speech does not conform to the perceived standard and/or the style of language expected by the speakers' interlocutor(s). Linguistic insecurity is situationally induced and is often based on a feeling of inadequacy regarding personal performance in certain contexts, rather than a fixed attribute of an individual. This insecurity can lead to stylistic, and phonetic shifts away from an affected speaker's default speech variety; these shifts may be performed consciously on the part of the speaker, or may be reflective of an unconscious effort to conform to a more prestigious or context-appropriate variety or style of speech. Linguistic insecurity is linked to the perception of speech varieties in any community, and so may vary based on socioeconomic class and gender. It is also especially pertinent in multilingual societies.

Description
Linguistic insecurity is the negative self-image a speaker has regarding his or her own speech variety or language as a whole, especially in the perceived difference between phonetic and syntactic characteristics of one's own speech and those characteristics of what is considered standard usage, encouraged prescriptively as a preferable way of speaking, or perceived socially to be the "correct" form of the language. Linguistic insecurity arises based on the perception of a lack of "correctness" regarding one's own speech, rather than any objective deficiencies in a particular language variety. This perception is at odds with modern linguistic knowledge, which generally holds that all forms of language are linguistically equal as devices of communication, regardless of the various social judgments attached to them. Modern linguistics normally refrains from making judgments about language as used by native speakers, rejecting the idea of linguistic correctness as scientifically unfounded, or at least assuming that any notions of correct usage are relative in nature; popular linguistic ideas and social expectations, however, do not necessarily follow the scholarly consensus.

In one of its earliest usages, the term linguistic insecurity was employed by linguist William Labov in his 1972 paper on the social stratification of the pronunciation of /r/ to describe the attitude that employees, at three different retail stores in New York, have towards their own speech patterns, in comparison to the Standard English form. Labov theorized that those employees who had the most extreme shift in style from their own speech variety (a casual style) to the standard form (a more emphatic style) were more insecure in a linguistic sense. The term has since been used to describe any situation in which a speaker is led to hypercorrect, or shift one's patterns of speech, due to a negative attitude or lack of confidence regarding one's normal speech. This lack of confidence need not be consciously acknowledged by a speaker in order for him/her to be affected by linguistic insecurity, and the changes in pronunciation and stylistic shifts indicative of linguistic insecurity can emerge absent of speaker intent. Linguistic insecurity may also be a characteristic of an entire speech community, especially in how it relates to other speech communities of the same language that employ a more standardized form. Linguistic insecurity might be induced by the belief that language is an extraneously regulated system that needs to be formally taught to its native speakers, rather than acquired in a natural way. This is often the case in standard language cultures, where a codified standard idiom tends to be equated with the language as a whole.

Standard and prestige forms
As linguistic insecurity is related to the perception of how one speaks in comparison to a certain form, the notion of standard and prestige forms of languages is important. The standard form of a language is regarded as the codified form of language used in public discourse, while the prestige form is the one perceived to receive the most respect accorded to any variety of the language. Variables that differentiate standard and prestige forms include phonetic realization, vocabulary, syntax, among other features of speech. The status of these forms is related to the concept of language ideology, which explains how varieties of language are correlated with certain moral, social or political values. Many societies value the belief that language homogeneity is beneficial to society; in fact, the existence of a "common language" is an intrinsic part of an imagined community, which defines a nation.

However, the concept of a language norm is highly flexible. Nations often codify a standard language that may be different from regional norms. For example, Standard English in the United Kingdom is based on the south-eastern dialect and accent centered around London. In other parts of the UK, various dialects are spoken, such as Scots and Geordie; even in London, there exist Cockney and Estuary accents. Studies of young people in Glasgow show that they self-report linguistic insecurity, describing their own speech as 'slang' in comparison to the 'standard form' and attempting to incline their own speech to the standard.

Prestige forms may also demonstrate linguistic insecurity. Again, in the UK, Received Pronunciation (RP), a prestige accent, has been affected by other varieties of speech. Though the standard form historically aimed towards RP, it is not a perfect imitation. The result is that RP speakers now demonstrate changes in phonetic realization in the direction of the standard.

Despite these shifts, a person using an RP accent would tend to give the impression that he or she is well-educated and part of a higher socioeconomic class. This is because these traits are often associated with RP speakers; they index specific concepts that are presupposed by the community. Similarly, in general, forms of speech gain their status by their association with certain class characteristics. This indexicality does not need to be passive: in Beijing, young urban professionals actively adopt usages considered typical of prestigious Hong Kong and Taiwan speech in an effort to index themselves as cosmopolitan. It also does not need to be positive: speech forms may also index negative characteristics. In his study of attitudes towards varieties of United States English, Preston demonstrates that people often associate the Southern accent with a lack of sophistication, indexing speakers with such an accent as being backwards and conservative; and that Southern speakers themselves perceive their language to be inferior, exhibiting linguistic insecurity.

Effects
Speakers experiencing linguistic insecurity exhibit alterations of their normal speech which are reflective of their insecurity, and often are a result of the speaker attempting to compensate for the perceived deficiencies in their own speech variety. These effects of linguistic insecurity can come in the form of changes in pronunciation, as in the case of the retail store employees in William Labov's example, or even syntactic deviations from the speaker's normal speech variant.

Hypercorrection

One documented linguistic effect of linguistic insecurity is hypercorrection. Hypercorrection is the over-application of a perceived rule of grammar in order to appear more formal or to appear to belong to a more prestigious speech community. A common instance of hypercorrection in English is the use of the personal pronouns "you and I" as a correction of "me and you" in situations in which the accusative personal pronoun "me" is more appropriate. Because the use of "you and I" is internalized as the more grammatically sound form in the mind of many English speakers, that rule becomes over-applied in a situation when a speaker wants to compensate for perceived linguistic deficiencies. A speaker may try to avoid feelings of linguistic insecurity and perceived stigmatization by projecting a more educated or formal identity and emulating what is perceived as a more prestigious speech variety. Inadvertently, hypercorrection may index a speaker as belonging to the very social class or societal group that led to the linguistic insecurity. For example, linguist Donald Winford found after studying Trinidadian English that there was a knowledge that there was a stigmatization associated with less prestigious phonological variants, creating a situation in which individuals belonging to a "lower" social class would attempt to replicate phonological aspects of the more prestigious forms of English, but did not do so successfully, thus engaging in hypercorrection.

Code Switching 

In addition to hypercorrection, Code-switching may also be performed by people who speak multiple languages and dialects. This may happen when speakers of one language fluently switches to another language in an interaction or conversation. Sociocultural studies Code-switching state there is a factor of identity that goes into account when Code-switching.  Identity can play a large role in linguistic insecurity as certain identities experience economic and social advantage. This identity factor is prevalent when marginalized groups switch to speak the more dominant standard language in the interaction.

Shifting registers

Speakers experiencing linguistic insecurity may also undergo, either consciously or unconsciously, a change in register from their default language variety. Linguistic register refers to a variety of speech in a given language that corresponds to a specific situational purpose or social setting. An example of the phonological impact of register in English is when speaking in a formal setting, it is customary to pronounce words ending in -ing with a velar nasal rather than substituting it with the [n] sound that is typical of -ing endings in informal speech. A register shift cannot always be accounted for by documenting the individual phonological differences in speech from one's default speech variety to the newly registered speech variety, but instead may include a difference in the overall "tenor" of speech and in the way a speaker gives deference to his/her interlocutors who are more experienced in interacting in that register. Having to navigate in a linguistic register markedly different from one's own speech variety can be a catalyst for hypercorrection and other behavioral effects of linguistic insecurity that can further contribute to a sense of communicative inadequacy if the speaker feels he is not convincingly interacting in that linguistic register.

Forms

Social category

Socioeconomic class
Findings show that the members of the lower middle class have the greatest tendency toward linguistic insecurity.  Labov notes that evidence of their insecurity can be found in their wide range of stylistic variation, fluctuation in given stylistic contexts, conscious striving for correctness, and negative attitude towards their native speech pattern.
 
After conducting a linguistic survey in 1960s New York City, Labov found evidence that the usage of /r/ by speakers was predictable except in a specific case involving the lower middle class. At the time, the pronunciation of /r/ at the end of words and before consonants became a prestige marker and the degree to which it was realized in casual speech correlated with the socioeconomic status of the respondents. However, members of the lower middle class showed a dramatic increase of r-pronunciation when a more formal style of speech was elicited, even surpassing the usage by the classes above. Labov interpreted this tendency to hypercorrect by adopting the prestigious form of the high ranking class as a sign of the linguistic insecurity of the lower middle class.
 
Explanations for why the lower middle class exhibits this tendency have yet to be fully explored. A study conducted by Owens and Baker (1984) shows that the lower middle class of Winnipeg, Manitoba, Canada had highest scores for the CILI (Canadian Index of Linguistic Insecurity), which was adopted from Labov's original test – the ILI (Index of Linguistic Insecurity). In their paper, they hypothesize that this effect can be explained by an interaction between behavior and attitudes about social status. Members of the lower middle class are caught between the linguistic behavior of the classes below them and the attitudes of the upper class. Members of the lower middle class accept the idea of correct speech from those above them, but changes in their usage lag behind changes in attitude. They identify the upper class usage as correct and admit that their behavior is different, leading to a disparity that manifests itself as linguistic insecurity.  Though Owens and Baker admit that a measure of the mobility aspirations of the respondents is needed to test their explanation, others agree that the effect can be best interpreted as a function of upward social mobility rather than of social class distinctions themselves. In his later work, Labov highlights that it is often the second highest status groups that display the steepest slope of style shifting, most hypercorrection, highest levels on linguistic insecurity tests, and the strongest tendency to stigmatize the speech of others in subjective evaluation tests for that variable. In many cases of socioeconomic stratification, this group is equated with the lower middle class.

Gender
In the Owens and Baker study mentioned above, the authors used the CILI and ILI test to conclude that women are more linguistically insecure than men. Out of a sampling data of 80 participants, 42 of which were female, women scored higher on the ILI and the CILI, which indicates high manifest linguistic insecurity. On the CILI, the mean score was 3.23 for females and 2.10 for males. On the ILI, the means scores were 2.23 for females and 1.40 for males.  Though the t-tests for the differences were only significant at .07 and .06 levels, the authors feel that this was due to a small sample size and that the uniformity of the results was enough to confirm their hypothesis. Additionally, these findings are consistent with Labov's original New York study and lead to the conclusion by Owens and Baker that women display more linguistic insecurity than men.

Cross-linguistic contact

Dialect
Linguistic insecurity can be heightened in speech communities in which multiple dialects exist beyond the standard language. Insecure speakers suffer from a negative attitude toward the speech of their dialect group and often feel pressured to mask their dialectal versatility since the norm of communication is to use the standard form. Bidialectal speakers, who speak both the standard and their own dialect, are most vulnerable to this problem because they are more aware of linguistic norms and the contexts to which they must adapt their speech to these norms. For monodialectal speakers, conversations can be difficult or stressful because they are locked into their nonstandard dialect and have a harder time explaining themselves in the standard dialect.

African American Vernacular English
African American Vernacular English (AAVE) is a dialect of American English that is associated with the African American ethnic group.  Speakers of AAVE (as well as speakers of other dialects found in the United States) have encountered a variety of sociolinguistic problems in many important institutions since Standard American English (SAE) is the predominant form of English used.

One of these important institutions is school. Concerns about the academic achievement of African American children have motivated researchers to study the role AAVE plays though there are various explanations for how it might affect achievement. Dialectal differences could lead to inappropriate testing procedures or prejudice of educators (having lowered expectations and assuming the child is inarticulate and hesitant). In this environment, AAVE-speaking students may develop linguistic insecurity, leading to a rejection of the standards as "posh" or reluctance to speak at all to hide their "inability" to use language. AAVE-speaking students have also been shown to hypercorrect in attempts to speak or write in Standard English. Insecurity about what "sounds right" may result in the avoidance of the invariant be by deleting it from an instance in which it would be proper to use it (e.g. "They said they were told if they didn't follow orders they would courtmarshled or shot as deserters").

Speakers of AAVE may also encounter problems in seeking treatment for mental health problems, where professionals predominantly use Standard American English. Linguistic insecurity can be a cause of miscommunication for AAVE patients. For example, mental health care providers may attribute speaker's behavior to cognitive or emotional deficits, even to a psychopathological extent. In a study of a psychiatric ward, Bucci and Baxter collected data on the impact of linguistic problems of the patients, which included several monodialectal speakers and bidialectal speakers of AAVE. In the case of "Jimmy", his background led his therapist to believe that his "muteness" resulted from emotional or neurophysiological problems. However, Bucci and Baxter found evidence indicating his position as a monodialectal AAVE speaker made him unwilling to speak. His linguistic insecurity in the clinical setting with a norm of SAE made him reluctant to speak, but he was fluent and expressive in his own speech community and with his descriptions of his experiences outside the ward. Moreover, standard therapeutic techniques may have a negative and opposite effect for linguistically insecure patient. In the case of the bidialectal "Arlene", the patient thought that her speech was an obstacle to communication because her therapist often asked her what she meant. The intervention of eliciting answers was meant to encourage Arlene to speak more freely, but her linguistic insecurity led her to focus her attention on the perceived inadequacy of her language style and she responded by saying less rather than more.

Malinke-Bambara
One example of linguistic insecurity arising from dialectal differences can be found in work done by Canut and Keita (1994). They conducted a study of an area in the Mandingo zone of Mali that exhibited a linguistic continuum between two different forms: Bambara and Malinke. The study included two villages (Bendugu and Sagabari), a middle-sized town (Kita), and the capital of Mali (Bamako). Bamako is on the Bambara extreme of the continuum, Sagabari on the Malinke extreme, and Bendugu and Kita in between. The linguistic features important for understanding the differences between the dialects are mainly phonological.

The area encompassing these four places has relatively high social mobility and those who gain status often move towards Bamako, the capital. The dialects follow this pattern, as those closer to the capital are perceived as more prestigious; the most peripheral form in Sagabari can even prompt mockery of the individual using it. Thus, those speaking a dialect different from Bambara are likely to be affected by linguistic insecurity, particularly those closer to the Malinke end of the continuum.
 
Since migration is common, there are many examples of young migrants to the area who display linguistic insecurity. Most migrants who speak Malinke try to hide their origins and assimilate to the higher status society by changing the way that they speak. In their attempts to escape their geosocial status, however, they tend to hypercorrect to the point where they create non-existent terms in Bambara.  One example is replacing every /h/ in Malinke with the /f/ used in Bamako, leading one to say 'young boy' /foron/ (which does not exist in Bamako) for 'noble' /horon/.

Creole languages

Linguistic insecurity in relation to creoles has to do with the underlying assumption and classification of these languages as inferior forms of the parent languages from which they are derived. Typical of most non-official languages, creoles are regarded as mere degenerate variants and rudimentary dialects that are subsumed under the main "standard" languages for that particular community. With this popular view, creoles are thought to be impoverished, primitive outputs that are far from their European target languages. The negative nonlinguistic implications lead to claims of creole use as being a "handicap" for their speakers. This has caused speakers of these creole languages to experience insecurity and lack of confidence in the use of their form of language, which has undermined the prevalence of creoles spoken in societies.

One explanation concerning the different attitudes of speakers is that some populations are more insistent of the use of their particular form of language, as it is commonly claimed to be more "pure." This assumption places this form as a more prestigious standard, creating a tense environment that promotes feelings of insecurity to those who do not follow this standard (and speak "impure" variations).

An instance of linguistic insecurity can be found in relation to Haitian Creole, which developed from a combination of French and other languages. Although the vast majority in this country grows up hearing and speaking exclusively this creole, it continues to be seen as an inferior, primitive tongue as well as a malformed version of French. This disfavor against the creole, which exists throughout the society, is present even among those who can speak only in that variation. The cause of the view has been attributed to the association of French with prestige, as most of the island's land-owning, well-educated elite speaks this language. These judgments contribute to the widespread belief that success is linked to French and that one must speak French to become part of the middle class with a financially stable job, a notion that places Haitian Creole on a lower status. Though it is the majority of people who cannot participate in the French-driven areas of society, the "ideology of disrespect and degradation" surrounding creoles leads to great linguistic insecurity. As Arthur Spears put it, an "internalized oppression" is present in these members who relate important figures in society (and their success) to speaking French, devaluing their own language of Haitian Creole.

Multilingual societies
Linguistic insecurity can arise in multilingual environments in speakers of the non-dominant language or of a non-standard dialect. Issues caused by the linguistic variation range from "total communication breakdowns involving foreign language speakers to subtle difficulties involving bilingual and bidialectal speakers". Multilingual insecurity can cause hypercorrection, code-switching, and shifting registers. Divergence from the standard variety by minority languages causes "a range of attitudinal issues surrounding the status of minority languages as a standard linguistic variety".  In multilingual societies, linguistic insecurity and subsequent effects are produced by identity status and marginalization of specific groups.

Quebec French
An example of mother-tongue-based linguistic insecurity in a multilingual environment is Quebec French. Due to a general perception of Quebec French as lacking in quality and diverging from the norm, French speaking Quebeckers have suffered from a sense of linguistic insecurity. Though French is widely spoken in Quebec, the French in France is considered by many to be the standard and prestigious form. This comparison and the fact that Quebec French diverges from the standard form of France have caused linguistic insecurity among Quebec speakers.

Due to the separation from France after the Treaty of Paris in 1763 and the multilingual environment, Quebec French become more anglicized through English pronunciations and borrowings. Though French Canadian speakers were aware of the differences between Quebec French and French, the foreign perception of Quebec French as "non-standard" was not an issue until the mid 19th century. The opinions of the French elite that Quebec French was "far removed from the prestigious variety spoken in Paris" had spread through the general public by the end of the 19th century, causing a deep sense of linguistic insecurity in French speaking Quebec. The insecurity was twofold since Quebeckers spoke neither the dominant English language nor, as they were being told, Standard French.

Technology

Social media 

Speakers of dialects varying from the linguistic standard may also be victims of discrimination in technology causing linguistic insecurity. The MIT social media language filter, Gobo, allows users to adjust their social media feeds to filter to their preference. Feeds were filtered by six categories: politics, seriousness, rudeness, gender, brands, and obscurity. The gender filter creates linguistic discrimination as it does not consider gender non-binary people. This creates linguistic insecurity as non-binary people with pronouns different from the linguistic standard must adhere to the pronouns of the gender binary (she/her/hers/he/him/his). The Gobo platform also tagged comments containing African-American Vernacular English (AAVE) under the "rudness" category.  This not only discriminates against speakers of AAVE but forces speakers to use Standard American English to be seen when communicating on the internet, creating a linguistic insecurity.

See also

References

Sociolinguistics